Unicauda is a genus of cnidarians belonging to the family Myxobolidae.

The species of this genus are found in Southern America.

Species:

Unicauda basiri 
Unicauda clavicauda 
Unicauda crassicauda

References

Cnidarian genera
Myxobolidae